Bill Nye Saves the World is an American television show streaming on Netflix hosted and created by Bill Nye. It is both a sequel and a revival of sorts of Bill Nye The Science Guy, which is also created by Bill Nye. The show's byline was, "Emmy-winning host Bill Nye brings experts and famous guests to his lab for a talk show exploring scientific issues that touch our lives",  with the series' focus placed on science and its relationship with politics, pop culture, and society. Unlike Nye's previous show Bill Nye the Science Guy (which is revived in this show) which was intended for children, Bill Nye Saves the World is intended for adults (especially those adults who watched Bill Nye the Science Guy when they were children during its original run in the 1990s). As such, some episodes have Nye discuss topics that would be considered inappropriate to mention to minors.

Though the show was hosted by Nye, five correspondents assist in the presentation of the show. These include fashion model Karlie Kloss, science YouTuber and educator Derek Muller, comedian Nazeem Hussain, comedian and writer Joanna Hausmann, and the TV host and producer Emily Calandrelli. The show's theme song was produced by Tyler, the Creator. The thirteen-episode first season premiered on April 21, 2017. A six-episode second season premiered on December 29, 2017, and a six-episode third season was released on May 11, 2018. Reception to the series has been mixed, with the first season being reviewed more positively by critics than audiences.

Release history
The thirteen-episode first season premiered on April 21, 2017. It explores topics such as climate change, alternative medicine, and video games from a scientific point of view, while also refuting myths and anti-scientific claims.

On June 15, 2017, Nye announced on his Facebook page that the series had been renewed for a six-episode second season, which premiered on December 29, 2017.

On April 9, 2018, Netflix announced the show had been renewed for a six-episode third season, released on May 11, 2018.

Episodes

Series overview

Season 1 (2017)

Season 2 (2017)

Season 3 (2018)
</onlyinclude>

Reception
Bill Nye Saves the World received mixed-to-positive reviews from critics but negative from audiences. The first season has an aggregate rating of 63/100 based on 5 reviews from Metacritic and a Rotten Tomatoes score of 73% based on 11 reviews, with an average rating of 7/10, while receiving only 28% audience approval based on over 500 user ratings. The performance segments of the show have been the focus of criticism. In particular, Rachel Bloom's performance in episode 9 has been described as "strange", "out of place", and a "painful couple of minutes". Conversely, NPR's Fresh Air said the show is "fun to watch," working well with Nye's "consistent reliance on scientific and provable facts." Vox praised Nye's unapologetic talking style, though worried this may alienate some viewers.

References

External links
 
 
 Bill Nye Saves the World on Rotten Tomatoes

2010s American television talk shows
2017 American television series debuts
2018 American television series endings
Television series by Bunim/Murray Productions
Adult education television series
American educational television series
Bill Nye
English-language Netflix original programming
Science education television series